Kazys Almenas (11 April 1935 – 7 October 2017) was a Lithuanian physicist, writer, essayist, and publisher.

Biography
Kazys Almenas was born in Gruzdžiai, Šiauliai County, Lithuania. He attended the University of Nebraska and Northwestern University. Between 1965 and 1967, he studied at the University of Warsaw and received a doctorate in physics. Almenas was teaching at the University of Maryland. 

Almenas currently lives in Lithuania and often publishes his essays in the Lithuanian press. Kazys Almenas is the founder of Fund Supporting Royal Palace (Valdovų rūmų paramos fondas) - a fund which helps financing a replica of a mediaeval Lithuanian Royal Palace in Vilnius.

Literary works
Almenas wrote the novels Upė į Rytus, upė į Šiaurę (1964), Šienapjūtė (1970), Sauja skatikų (1977), and Lietingos dienos Palangoje (1988) and the collections of short stories Bėgiai (1965) and Gyvenimas tai kekė vyšnių (1967), Vaivos juosta (2014).

References

External links
 Fund Supporting Royal Palace

1935 births
2017 deaths 
People from Šiauliai District Municipality
Lithuanian physicists
Lithuanian writers
Northwestern University alumni